Roy Littlejohn (2 June 1933 - 6 Sept 2022) was an English former footballer who played in the Football League for Bournemouth & Boscombe Athletic. He was an England amateur international and won the 1958 Amateur Cup with Woking.

Littlejohn, who played as an outside-right, began his football career as a junior with Bournemouth & Boscombe Athletic, and made his first-team debut during the 1952–53 season. He was on Portsmouth's books for a time while doing his National Service with the Royal Engineers, and by 1957 was a Woking player, and, as a PT instructor, was involved in training the team. He was part of the Woking team that won the FA Amateur Cup in 1958, involved in the first two goals as Woking defeated Ilford 3–0 at Wembley.

Littlejohn retained amateur status throughout his career, and was capped a number of times for the England amateur team. He played for the Great Britain Olympic team eliminated in the qualifying round for the 1956 Games, but was not selected for the team which eventually competed by special invitation. He also was part of a British "FA XI" that toured Nigeria and Ghana in 1958.

He pursued a career in architecture later on in life.

References

1933 births
Living people
Footballers from Bournemouth
English footballers
England amateur international footballers
Association football wingers
AFC Bournemouth players
Portsmouth F.C. players
Woking F.C. players
English Football League players